Erica Whyman, OBE (born 27 October 1969) is an English theatre director who became deputy artistic director at the Royal Shakespeare Company in January 2013.

Background
Whyman was born in Harrogate, Yorkshire, but lived in Barnsley until aged eight, before her family moved to Surrey. She studied French and Philosophy at Oxford University and theatre with Philippe Gaulier in Paris and then at the Bristol Old Vic Theatre School. Whyman was the Chief Executive at Northern Stage, Newcastle upon Tyne, from 2005–2012. 

In 2013, Whyman became deputy artistic director of the Royal Shakespeare Company. In September 2021, she became acting artistic director of the RSC.

Personal life and honours
In 2013, she was appointed an OBE in the New Year Honours List. She has a daughter, Ruby, with playwright Richard Bean.

Career
 1997 – Awarded the John S Cohen Bursary for Directors at the National Theatre Studio
 1997–98 – Associate producer of Tricycle Theatre
 1998–2000 – Associate director of English Touring Theatre
 1999–2001 – Artistic director Southwark Playhouse (Peter Brook Empty Space Award)
 2001–04 – Artistic director and chief executive of Gate Theatre
 2004–05 – Fellow of the Clore Leadership Programme in the first cohort
 2005–2012 – Chief executive of Northern Stage, Newcastle upon Tyne (TMA Award for Theatre Manager of the Year, 2012)

Northern Stage productions
 Son of Man (2006)
 Ruby Moon (2007)
 Our Friends in the North (2007)
 A Christmas Carol (2007)
 A Doll's House (2008)
 Look Back in Anger (2009)
 Hansel and Gretel (2008)
 Oh What a Lovely War (2010, nominated for two TMA awards)
 The Wind in the Willows (2010)
 Who's Afraid of Virginia Woolf (2011)
 The Glass Slipper (2011)
 Oh, The Humanity (2012)
 The Borrowers (2012)

Royal Shakespeare Company productions 

 The Christmas Truce (2014)
 Hecuba (2015)
 A Midsummer Night's Dream: A Play for the Nation (2016)
 The Seven Acts of Mercy (2016)
 The Earthworks (2017)
 Romeo and Juliet (2018)
 Miss Littlewood (2018)
 The Winter's Tale, broadcast on BBC Four (2021)

Other productions

 The Winter's Tale (2000, Southwark Playhouse)
 Les Justes (2001, Gate Theatre)
 Witness (Gate Theatre, 2002)
 Marieluise (Gate Theatre, 2004)
 The Flu Season (Gate Theatre, 2003)
 The Shadow of a Boy (National Theatre, 2002)
 The Birthday Party (Sheffield Crucible, 2002)

References

External links
 

1969 births
Living people
Alumni of Bristol Old Vic Theatre School
English theatre directors
Royal Shakespeare Company members
Officers of the Order of the British Empire